is a railway station located in Nisshin, Nayoro, Hokkaido, Japan and is operated by the Hokkaido Railway Company (JR Hokkaidō).

Lines Serviced
Hokkaido Railway Company
Sōya Main Line

Adjacent stations

External links
Ekikara Time Table – JR Nisshin Station (Japanese)

Railway stations in Hokkaido Prefecture
Railway stations in Japan opened in 1959